New Orleans is a 1929 American drama film directed by Reginald Barker and starring Ricardo Cortez, William Collier Jr., Alma Bennett. It was produced and distributed by the independent Tiffany Pictures.

Synopsis
Two friends, a jockey and a racetrack owner, fall out over a woman they both love.

Soundtrack
Here is a web site with the soundtrack recorded from original 16" discs.
http://mst.cdbpdx.com/MSTNO29/
Reels 1 thru 6 have only music, sound effects like doors closing, trains, horses galloping, crowd noise, and a few guttural utterances. The song Pals Forever is sung by a noticeably inebriated quartet in the 2nd reel.  Except for the song PALS FOREVER in reel 2, there isn't much dialog until reel 7.

Cast
 Ricardo Cortez as Jim Morley 
 William Collier Jr. as Billy Slade 
 Alma Bennett as Marie Cartier

References

Bibliography
 Pitts, Michael R. Poverty Row Studios, 1929–1940: An Illustrated History of 55 Independent Film Companies, with a Filmography for Each. McFarland & Company, 2005.

External links
 

1929 films
1929 drama films
1920s English-language films
Films directed by Reginald Barker
Tiffany Pictures films
American horse racing films
American black-and-white films
1920s American films